Feyzabad (also Romanized as Feyẕābād, Faīzābād, and Feīz Abad; also known as Ḩasanābād) is a village in Khorram Dasht Rural District, in the Central District of Famenin County, Hamadan Province, Iran. At the 2006 census, its population was 2,427, in 576 families.

References 

Populated places in Famenin County